Montgomery Court may refer to:

 Montgomery Court (Portland State University), designed by A. E. Doyle, now a Portland State University residence hall
Montgomery Court (Denver, Colorado), listed on the National Register of Historic Places

See also
Montgomery House (disambiguation)
Montgomery County Courthouse (disambiguation)